The origins of modern banking can be traced to medieval and early Italian Renaissance, to the rich cities in the north like Florence, Lucca, Siena, Venice and Genoa. The Bardi and Peruzzi families dominated banking in 14th-century Florence, establishing branches in many other parts of Europe. One of the most famous Italian banks was the Medici Bank, set up by Giovanni di Bicci de' Medici in 1397. The earliest known state deposit bank, Banco di San Giorgio (Bank of St. George), was founded in 1407 at Genoa, Italy, while Banca Monte dei Paschi di Siena, founded in 1472, is the oldest surviving bank in the world. 

In 1893, following the Banca Romana scandal, the Italian government formed the Bank of Italy, the nation's first central bank, as part of massive reforms to the banking sector.

There are three main types of credit institutions and banks in Italy. Commercial banks, which include three national banks, chartered banks, cooperative banks, and private banks across the country are the most common. However, savings banks organized on a provincial or regional basis in addition to investment institutions that issue bonds and provide medium- and long-term credit for public works and agriculture provide additional financial services.

Unicredit is one of the largest bank in Europe by capitalization and Assicurazioni Generali is the seventh in the world by total assets.

See also

List of banks in Italy

References

External links 
Major banks in Italy